John Dennis Meyer (born April 8, 1950, in Jefferson City, Missouri) is a former professional American football defensive back and coach.

An All-American defensive back at Arkansas State, Meyer signed with the Pittsburgh Steelers in 1973, playing safety and punt returner for the team.  He was cut before the 1974 season and signed with the Portland Storm of the World Football League.  He later signed with the Atlanta Falcons for 1975, but was cut before the season started.  He next signed with the Calgary Stampeders where he played two seasons as a safety and punt returner.

After his retirement as a player, Meyer was hired to coach Calgary's defensive backfield.  In 1982, he joined the Toronto Argonauts as defensive backfield and special teams coach.  He was promoted to defensive coordinator and, in 1992, he replaced Adam Rita as head coach of the Argonauts.  He had a 3-4 record over the team's final seven games and missed the playoffs.  He was fired after a 1-9 start in 1993 and replaced by Bob O'Billovich.

In 1996, he coached Great Bridge High School in Virginia.  He resigned in 1997 so he could move to Atlanta with his third wife.  The Wildcats went 1-9 in his only season at the helm.

In 2007, he was a defensive coach for the Cherokee High School Warriors of Canton, Georgia, under the head leadership of Brian Dameron.

In 2008, he became a sixth grade teacher at Little River Elementary in Woodstock, Georgia.

In 2009, he became the defensive back coach at River Ridge High School in Woodstock, Georgia.

Notes

1950 births
Living people
People from Canton, Georgia
People from Woodstock, Georgia
Sportspeople from the Atlanta metropolitan area
Sportspeople from Jefferson City, Missouri
Players of American football from Georgia (U.S. state)
Players of American football from Missouri
American football safeties
Arkansas State Red Wolves football players
Pittsburgh Steelers players
Portland Storm players
American players of Canadian football
Canadian football defensive backs
Calgary Stampeders players